Zhenyuan Yi, Hani and Lahu Autonomous County is an autonomous county under the jurisdiction of Pu'er City, in the west central part of Yunnan Province, China.

Administrative divisions
In the present, Zhenyuan Yi, Hani and Lahu Autonomous County has 8 towns and 1 township.
8 towns

1 township
 Tianba

Ethnic groups
The Zhenyuan County Gazetteer (1995:74-79) lists the following ethnic groups and locations. All population statistics, given in parentheses, are as of 1988.

Yi
Luoluo 倮倮 (30,065 people)
Lawu 拉乌 (6,455 people): Zhedong 者东乡 Maidi 麦地, Madeng 马邓; Jiading 九甲乡 Santai 三台, Guoji 果吉, Jiujia 九甲
Xiangtang 香堂 (12,312)
Mili 米利 (1,127 people): Liwei 里崴乡 Xinjie 新街村 Laomahe 老马河社, Pingdi 平地村 Hetaohe 核桃河社, Wenduo 文夺村 Longshucao 龙树槽社; Mengda 勐大乡 Wenlai 文来村, small parts of Zhentai 振太乡 Taitou 台头村 
Menghua 蒙化 (345 people): Zhentai 振太, Liwei 里崴, Mengda 勐大, part of Enle 恩乐镇
Ache 阿车 (117 people): Heping 和平乡 Yakou 丫口村, Zhedong 者东乡 Zhangpen 樟盆村 
Shansu 山苏 (150 people): Zhedong 者东乡 Zhangpen 樟盆村, Heping 和平乡 Yakou 丫口村
Guaigun 拐棍 (309 people): Tianba 田坝乡 Tianba 田坝, Santai/Sanhe 三台/三合, Lianhe 联合, Minqiang 民强 
Luowu 罗武 (50 people): Heping 和平乡 Yakou 丫口村
Hani
Kaduo 卡多
Biyue 碧约
Budu 布都
Bukong 布孔
Baikuo 白阔 (also Biyue 碧约): Gucheng Village 古城村 Meiziqing 梅子箐, Naka 那卡; also some near county seat
Woni 窝尼: Sanzhangtian Township 三章田乡 Xinguang 新光, Banghai 帮海 
Lahu (autonym: Guocuo 锅挫; exonyms: Kucong 苦聪, Guzong 古宗, Kagui 卡桂)

Climate

References

External links
Zhenyuan County Official Site

County-level divisions of Pu'er City
Hani autonomous counties
Lahu autonomous counties
Yi autonomous counties